The Ministry of Labour, Employment and Social Security (MTEySS) is a ministry of the Argentine Government tasked with overseeing the country's public policies on labour conditions, employment and social security.

It proposes, designs, elaborates, administers and supervises the policies in all that is inherent to the relations and individual and collective conditions of work, to the legal regime of collective bargaining and of the professional associations of workers and employers, to employment, job training and social security. In addition, it is informally tasked with overseeing the government's relationship with Argentina's trade unions.

The Ministry was founded in 1949, when the Secretariat of Labour and Prevision was elevated to ministerial level in the first cabinet of President Juan Perón; the first minister was José María Freire. It was briefly disestablished during the dictatorship of Juan Carlos Onganía, being restored during the third and last presidency of Perón in 1973. It was also demoted to a secretariat for a short period during the presidency of Mauricio Macri, from 2018 to 2019. The current minister is Kelly Olmos, who has served since 10 December 2019 in the cabinet of President Alberto Fernández.

List of ministers

References

External links
  

Government ministries of Argentina
Argentina
1949 establishments in Argentina
Labor in Argentina